Giusi Nicolini (born Giuseppina Maria Nicolini, 5 March 1961) is an Italian politician, former Mayor of Lampedusa e Linosa.

Biography
A member of the Legambiente environmentalist association, after having been Deputy Mayor and Councilor for the Environment of Lampedusa e Linosa from 1983 to 1988, Nicolini is elected Mayor at the 2012 local elections.

After the 2013 migrant shipwreck near to the shores of Lampedusa, in which more than 300 migrants have drowned, Nicolini asked to the European Union to realize a new European law on sanctuary and immigration rules.

Due to her several efforts in order to promote integration and solidarity, Nicolini has been awarded with the UNESCO Award for Peace in 2017. That same year, she tried to be re-elected Mayor at the local elections, but failed.

References

1961 births
Living people
Democratic Party (Italy) politicians
21st-century Italian politicians